The Heart Attack Grill is an American hamburger restaurant in downtown Las Vegas, Nevada, (formerly located in Chandler, Arizona). It makes a point of serving food that is very unhealthy and high in fat, sugar, and cholesterol; in other words, food that, if eaten frequently, will increase the chance of a heart attack, hence the name.

The menu is generally themed around items that are exceptionally high in calories and fat. Customers can also order unfiltered cigarettes, or candy cigarettes for children.

Beverages and to-go orders are excluded and sharing food is also not allowed for the free food deal. One of the restaurant's promotions is a reward for customers who finish a Triple or Quadruple Bypass Burger, after which they are placed in a wheelchair and wheeled out to their vehicle by their "personal nurse".

Theme 

The establishment is a hospital theme restaurant: waitresses ("nurses") and waiters ("doctors") take orders ("prescriptions") from the customers ("patients"). Each patient dons a hospital gown and wristband before ordering.

Those who do not finish the Heart Attack Grill challenge will receive a paddling by one of the "nurses" with the option to buy the paddle afterwards.

History 

The Heart Attack Grill was founded in 2005 in Tempe, Arizona, by Jon Basso, with the declared intent of serving "nutritional pornography," food "so bad for you it's shocking." The idea came when writing a marketing thesis about fitness training studios, as he became inspired by stories about his clients cheating on their diets.

The Arizona location closed on May 31, 2011, with a Heart Attack Grill opening in Dallas, Texas, earlier that month. The Dallas restaurant closed in October 2011 due to non-payment of rent, and the restaurant's official website was scrubbed of any Dallas location information.

The Las Vegas location opened in October 2011, and is legally owned by Jon Basso's LLC, ironically named Diet Center LLC.

On February 18, 2012, a D.C. group requested for the owner of Heart Attack Grill to declare "moral bankruptcy" and to close the Las Vegas restaurant. However, the owner did not close the restaurant and defended his restaurant.

Illnesses and deaths 
The restaurant's spokesman,  Blair River, died on March 1, 2011, aged 29, from complications of pneumonia. The Arizona location closed shortly thereafter, on May 31, 2011.

On February 11, 2012, a customer suffered what was reported to be an apparent heart attack while eating a "Triple Bypass Burger" at the restaurant. Restaurant owner Jon Basso called 9-1-1 and the customer was taken to the hospital. Reportedly patrons thought it was a stunt and started taking photos. Basso later said, "I actually felt horrible for the gentleman because the tourists were taking photos of him as if it were some type of stunt. Even with our own morbid sense of humor, we would never pull a stunt like that."

On April 21, 2012, a woman fell unconscious while eating a Double Bypass Burger, drinking alcohol, and smoking.

In February 2013, an unofficial spokesman and daily patron, 52-year-old John Alleman, died of an apparent heart attack while waiting at a bus stop in front of the restaurant.

Reception 
Heart Attack Grill has deliberately courted controversy as a marketing strategy. The restaurant has been criticized and drawn complaints for its uniforms and naughty portrayal of nurses.

In television 
The restaurant was featured on an episode of Extreme Pig-outs on the Travel Channel, All You Can Eat on The History Channel,  World's Weirdest Restaurants on Food Network Canada, ABC News, on a CBS report with Bill Geist,  on Khawatir 10 on MBC, on 7 Deadly Sins on Showtime, on the pilot episode on Fluffy Breaks Even, and The Kyle Files.

In France, it appeared in an episode devoted to Las Vegas of the television program Drôles de villes pour une rencontre.

In Spain, it appeared in the thirty-third episode of the seventh season of the television program Madrileños por el mundo, dedicated to Las Vegas, and also in the tenth episode of the second season of the television program Viajeros Cuatro, also dedicated to Las Vegas.

See also 

 Junk food
 List of restaurants in the Las Vegas Valley
 List of hamburger restaurants
 Obesity in the United States
 Breastaurant
 Food challenge

References

External links 

 
 Nightline from ABC News Story (Video)

Fast-food hamburger restaurants
Restaurants in Arizona
Privately held companies based in Arizona
Restaurants in Dallas
Restaurants in Las Vegas, Nevada
Buildings and structures in Maricopa County, Arizona
Companies based in Chandler, Arizona
Theme restaurants
Restaurants established in 2005
2005 establishments in Arizona
2011 establishments in Nevada
2011 establishments in Texas
2011 disestablishments in Arizona
2011 disestablishments in Texas
Hamburger restaurants in the United States